Sir J. J. College of Architecture is an architecture school located in downtown Mumbai (Bombay), affiliated to University of Mumbai in the state of Maharashtra, India. Sharing its premises with Sir J. J. School of Art and Sir J.J. School of Applied Art (now known as Commercial Art), it is now rented from Government of Maharashtra as per the deed of Sir Jamsetjee Jejeebhoy. The college occupies two buildings (commonly known as "Old Building" and "New Building"), housing the teaching and non teaching departments along with a small workshop area and canteen space. The Old Building is one of the heritage buildings in the campus.

In 2008, it was recognised as a participant under the United States Agency for International Development (USAID) ECO (Energy Conservation and Commercialisation) III Project by the Bureau of Energy Efficiency (BEE) — India.

It offers two courses namely, Bachelor of Architecture (undergraduate, B.Arch – 5 years) and Master of Architecture (postgraduate, M.Arch – 2 years). The B.Arch course intake of seats for every academic year is approximately 70 students. Every academic year begins in the month of August and ends in the month of April.

Every year, the school publishes a magazine known as "Shilpsagar" meaning ocean of crafts (shilp = craft, sagar = ocean).

History

Established in 1913, it was Asia's first architecture school, attached with Sir J. J. School of Art, itself established in 1896. In 1958, Sir J. J. School of Art was divided, with the Departments of Architecture and Applied Art becoming the Sir J. J. College of Architecture and Sir J.J. Institute of Applied Art respectively.

Sir J.J college of architecture is considered one of the foremost institutions of Architecture in India and is a recognized college of architecture all over the world. The origin can be traced to the founding of a Draftsman's Class, started with a view to produce men with a practical and really useful knowledge, fit to be employed in an Architect's office attached to the Sir J.J School of Arts in 1896, set up in the year 1857 by the erstwhile Government of Bombay from the grants made by the philanthropist Sir Jamshedji Jeejeebhoy, the first Baronet of Bombay.

The course was re-organized in 1913 to make it suitable for training in Architecture, and the Government Diploma Examination in Architecture was held subsequently. Robert Cable was appointed as the first Professor of Architecture and headed the department until 1923. Cable, and his most distinguished successors, Professor Claude Batley (1923–43), Professor C. M. Master (1943–48) and Professor Solomon Reuben (1948–59) took the architectural department into a new modernist phase. The entire course however, was again re-organized in 1936 and was made into a full-time Five-year course.  In 1952, the department of Architecture was affiliated to the University of Bombay for teaching the courses leading to the Degree of Architecture. In 2013, the school completed 100 years of its establishment and has been consistently ranked the BEST architecture college in the country by national academic surveys.

The campus is a home to some of the oldest trees and plants in the city of Mumbai.

Timeline

Notable alumni
 Anthony Almeida - Tanzanian modernist architect
 Achyut Kanvinde - Architect
 Balkrishna Doshi - Architect
Minnette de Silva - Architect
 Remo Fernandes - Musician, Singer-songwriter, Actor
 Divita Rai - Miss Universe India 2022
 Abdulhusein M. Thariani - Architect with buildings in Mumbai (1930s-1947); Karachi (1940s - 1960s) and Dhaka (1950s-early 1960s). Also designed the Baitul Mukarram in Dhaka, Bangladesh.

References

External links
 Sir JJ College of Architecture, Official website
 Brief profile of Sir J.J.
 Brief biography of Sir J.J.

University of Mumbai
Educational institutions established in 1913
Architecture schools in India
1913 establishments in India